Felecity Willis (born October 31, 1978) is an American basketball referee and former player. She was a two-sport athlete for University of Arizona, playing college basketball and college softball for the Arizona Wildcats. She later played professional basketball for several years and was a member of the Puerto Rico national basketball team.

Early life
Willis attended Apple Valley High School in Apple Valley, California where she starred at basketball.

College career
She played college basketball and softball in the United States with the University of Arizona Wildcats. She was a All-Pac-10 Conference player in 1999 and 2000.

Professional career
Following her college career, Willis went on to play professionally. In 2002, she played for the Chicago Blaze of the NWBL. She also saw pre-season action in the WNBA, with the Los Angeles Sparks in 2000, the Charlotte Sting in 2001 and the Washington Mystics in 2003.

Willis has been a four-time All-star with the Criollas de Caguas women's BSN team. She has helped carry the Criollas to two consecutive finals, where they were upset both times by the Carolina Giants.

In January 2006, Willis joined the Sundsvall DB of the Swedish Basketligan dam, leading the club to the quarterfinal of the playoffs. She appeared in 13 games, averaging 18.2 points, 4.7 rebounds and 6.6 assists per game. Two years later, in March 2008, Willis rejoined Sundsvall, this time with the team in danger of relegation. She appeared in five games, including four straight victories, helping the club stave of relegation. In the five games, she averaged 17.2 points, 4.0 rebounds and 4.8 assists per game.

National team career
Willis was a member of the Puerto Rican national team for six years, and played at the 2003 Central American and Caribbean Games in El Salvador, and in 2004 in Guatemala.

Later life
Following her playing career, Willis went into officiating. In 2010, she attended officiating training camp run by NCAA referee Bob Scofield at Flowing Wells High School. By 2013, she was officiating NCAA Division I Women's games. In 2018 she was appointed a referee in the Pac-12 Conference.

References

External links
Profile at Latinbasket.com

1978 births
Living people
American softball players
American women's basketball players
American expatriate basketball people in Sweden
Arizona Wildcats women's basketball players
Charlotte Sting players
Los Angeles Sparks players
Puerto Rican softball players
Puerto Rican women's basketball players
Washington Mystics players
American women referees and umpires